The New Holland TC45 is a four-wheel drive compact tractor, adapted to suit the launch and recovery requirements for some of the RNLI's inflatable inshore lifeboats from beach and shore-based lifeboat stations.

Specification 

The RNLI engineering department in Poole worked with the tractor company New Holland to design a small launch tractor for stations which operate D-class inflatable lifeboats. The powerful small diesel engine gives out . The tractor is undersealed to resist a saline environment. The tractor is fitted with turf tyres, which function better on sand, as well as wooden and concrete slipways. The specification complies with DVLA legislation, allowing the tractor to be used on public highways.

Tractor fleet

See also 
 Talus MB-4H launch tractor
 Talus MB-H Launch tractor
 Talus MB-764 Launch tractor
 Talus Atlantic 85 DO-DO launch carriage

References 

New Holland TC45 launch tractor
Sea-going tractors
Tractors
Rescue equipment